Far-right politics in Serbia emerged shortly before the break-up of Yugoslavia and has been present ever since. Its manifestation mostly focuses on national and religious factors.

After the World War I, the far-right in Yugoslavia received little amount of support, although politicians and groups alike had existed. Milan Stojadinović, a Yugoslav Serb politician, served as Prime Minister of Yugoslavia from 1935 to 1939 and saw fascism as an ideological role model for his premiership. Additionally, Dimitrije Ljotić headed Zbor, a party that was inspired by Italian fascism, anti-communism, and antisemitism. Ljotić also cooperated with Bishop Nikolaj Velimirović, an antisemite who also promoted anti-Western ideas. Milan Nedić, who was appointed prime minister of the puppet government in 1941, was a supporter of fascist ideas, and promoted conspiracy theories about Jews. Chetniks under Draža Mihailović, supported royalism, nationalism, and the creation of Greater Serbia within Yugoslavia. Mihailović collaborated with the Axis powers as early as in 1941, while Chetniks remained as an inspiration for modern far-right groups. After the death of Josip Broz Tito in 1980, the early 1980s recession crisis in Yugoslavia began while the League of Communists of Serbia (SKS) also began promoting ethnic nationalist views. Slobodan Milošević, who also later formed direct connections with the far-right, exploited the crisis and organised the anti-bureaucratic revolution which helped him to come to power.

At the same period, the far-right re-emerged, this time in Republic of Serbia, and it garnered broader acceptance due to the Yugoslav Wars. Vojislav Šešelj and his Serbian Radical Party (SRS) gained support from the public after they used sanctions, increased inflation, and high unemployed rate in their advantage to boost their support. SRS closely cooperated with Milošević during the 1990s, although it also briefly served in opposition. Far-right organisations acted as paramilitaries and they committed violence during the Bosnian and Kosovo wars. The White Eagles, which were operated by Šešelj, were also referred as "chetniks". Far-right groups became registered movements and organisations after the Overthrow of Slobodan Milošević, and attacks orchestrated by the far-right had also risen. Due to the allegations that the government was involved in corrupt privatisations, SRS campaigned on an anti-corruption platform and topped first in the 2003 parliamentary election; it also placed first in the 2007 election. Věra Stojarová, a Masaryk University professor, said that these results showed the "high frustration of Serbs". The far-right also received further support after the series of events in 2008; they also organised protests which turned out violent. The Belgrade anti-gay riot, which occurred in October 2010, was organised by the far-right, including groups such as Obraz. The Constitutional Court later concluded a ban on Nacionalni stroj and Obraz, in 2011 and 2012 respectively. Since then, some far-right groups pacificated their actions. The far-right embraced opposition to immigration in the mid-to-late 2010s, with parties and organisations such as Dveri, Leviathan, and People's Patrol embracing the sentiment. Additionally, the far-right had seen a rise in popularity in 2020; attacks and protests by the far-right also occurred, while after the beginning of the 2022 Russian invasion of Ukraine, far-right groups had been vocally opposed to imposing sanctions on Russia. The invasion helped pro-Russian and far-right parties to cross the threshold in the 2022 general election.

The far-right in Serbia could be divided into the Christian right and neo-Nazi variants. In general, far-right groups can also be antisemitic and Islamophobic, while they also often promote conspiracy theories. Far-right groups and individuals often glorify convicted war criminals like Radovan Karadžić and Ratko Mladić, while some groups also called for rehabilitation of collaborationists Milan Nedić and Dimitrije Ljotić. Violent protests or attacks against ethnic minorities and the LGBT community had been conducted by far-right groups. The far-right promotes anti-Western sentiment and Euroscepticism, while they support closer ties with Russia. They orchestrated attacks against activists and non-governmental organisations, and they frequently label them as "foreign mercenaries". Additionally, the far-right promotes anti-communism, militarism and religious fanaticism. Far-right groups have ties with the Serbian Orthodox Church (SPC), they also promote patriarchal values, and support the return of Kosovo's sovereignty under Serbia. They also use the Serbian eagle and variants of crosses as their symbols. Numerous far-right groups emerged in Serbia, such as I live for Serbia, Nacionalni stroj, Obraz, People's Patrol, and SNP 1389, while some had also turned into political parties like Dveri, Leviathan, and Serbian Party Oathkeepers (SSZ). The unemployed working-class youth is often recruited by far-right groups; the far-right tends to present themselves as "patriotic" groups or as humanitarian organisations. Far-right groups stayed small in number and have been institutionally marginal, although Internet pages and groups that promote far-right content had received large amounts of following. According to 2010 and 2011 reports, newspapers such as Glas javnosti, Večernje novosti, and Pravda were mainly associated with far-right politics. The Serbian far-right made impacts on the ideological views of domestic terrorists such as Anders Behring Breivik and Brenton Tarrant.

Overview

Definition 

According to contemporary historian Barbara N. Wiesinger, the far-right could be divided into two groups; the first group is influenced by the Christian right, clerical nationalism, conservatism, xenophobia, and it generally has ties with the Serbian Orthodox Church (SPC). The other group is well-connected with international neo-Nazi and white supremacist groups who also promote xenophobia and authoritarian views; the difference between the two groups is that the latter's views are rather centered on race. Jovo Bakić, a sociologist, noted that far-right groups also tend to be antisemitic and Islamophobic. Far-right individuals also often glorify convicted war criminals such as Vojislav Šešelj, Radovan Karadžić, and Ratko Mladić, while some groups are also supportive of collaborationists Milan Nedić and Dimitrije Ljotić, and called for their rehabilitation. Far-right groups also promote historical revisionism about these figures. Promotion of conspiracy theories is common amongst the far-right.

Bakić also noted that far-right groups also promote a culture of "youth violence", since they regularly organise clashes with the police, or against minorities such as the Romani, LGBT population, and leftists. He also stated that far-right groups form a perception of enemies, which commonly tend to be the West, traditional political parties, or minorities, while they regard Russia as a friend or a "brother". Far-right groups focus their ideological aims towards minorities to gain public support; besides the Romani popularity, Muslims are also a common target. This resulted into the formation of "welfare chauvinism", which portrays the minorities as "undeserving". The development of welfare chauvinism in Serbia has been similar to that in other parts of Europe; they portray minorities as "undeserving" and they argue that minorities do not deserve to benefit from Serbian welfare programs. Initially, the far-right focused on other ethnic groups in former Yugoslavia due to the Yugoslav Wars, although they turned towards "internal enemies" after the overthrow of Slobodan Milošević. At least since the late 2010s, far-right groups also began promoting several narratives regarding migrants due to the European migrant crisis, such as referring them as an enemy, and claiming that migrants are criminals or terrorists. Far-right groups regularly organise protests that are known for generating violence; they often participate in football match fights, and organised attacks against participators at pride parades. Neo-Nazi groups are connected with hooligan groups, while far-right groups and football fan organisations generally have conjoint membership.

Far-right groups are also known by their anti-Western sentiment and Euroscepticism, which they manifest through attacks towards non-governmental organisations (NGOs) and activists; far-right groups usually describe them as "anti-state", "anti-Serb" or "foreign mercenaries". They are also known for assaulting human rights and pro-democracy activists and NGO headquarters. Studies had shown that far-right groups tend to feel less close to other European nations. Far-right groups also promote the notion that Western powers advocated secessionist nationalism in the republics of SFR Yugoslavia; this was due to the positions of Western politicians that advocated for the internal borders of republics to remain unchanged. Alongside perceiving the West as an enemy, the far-right also outlined the socialist government of Yugoslavia as an enemy; they refer it as a dictatorship and as "anti-patriots" due to the narratives that the government allegedly attempted to destroy "Serbian national and religious identity and tradition". Anti-communism is also a key element of far-right groups; they tend to downplay the success of Yugoslav Partisans during World War II by promoting historical revisionism, and attempt to discredit the progress that was achieved during the existence of SFR Yugoslavia. Far-right groups had also openly taken part in Victory Day commemorations due to their pro-Russian views; their participation is in stark contrast to the anti-communist sentiment that is present in Serbia and other post-socialist countries. Most far-right groups espouse militarism, religious fanaticism, chauvinism, and they support the return of Kosovo's sovereignty under Serbia, as well as preserving traditional and patriarchal values, and opposing abortion. Regarding economics, far-right groups in Serbia tend to advocate economics that are more left-wing than in other countries. In regards to religion, far-right groups formed connections with the SPC in the 1990s.

Symbolism 
National symbols, such as the Serbian cross and Serbian eagle, had been adopted by far-right groups. In case of the cross, far-right groups often use two different variants; the first one is silver-colored while the other one is red-coloured. Other groups also use the Russian cross as their symbol, while Obraz and Serbian Action use the Christogram as a "Christian Orthodox-patriotic" symbol. The Serbian tricolor is widely used by far-right organisations. Far-right groups also frequently use chants such as "Serbia to the Serbs". They also use pejorative terms for minority groups in Serbia.

During the Yugoslav Wars, turbo-folk music was used to promote nationalist and revisionist viewpoints. Notably Serbia Strong, a song that lauded the actions of Serb military personnel such as war criminal Radovan Karadžić, and boasted about ethnic cleansing against Croats and Bosniaks, later became an internet meme where it was alternatively titled "Remove Kebab", and attracted further attention when it was played by Brenton Tarrant before instigating the Christchurch mosque shootings. Beogradski Sindikat (BS), a hip-hop collective, promoted conservative and far-right views through music. Škabo, a prominent member of BS, used to associate himself with Dveri, while Aleksandar Protić headed the Third Serbia political party, which was formed out of Dveri. A clothing brand name Otadžbina depicts neo-Nazi imagery and is used by some football fans in Serbia.

Influence 

Far-right groups recruit working-class youth who are usually unemployed and generally uneducated. The youth developed strong public political opinions against the West, NATO, and Western democracy due to the Yugoslav Wars and sanctions. According to authors Denoeux and Carter, in 2009 they stated that socio-economic, political, and cultural issues tend to radicalise the population. Far-right groups present themselves as "patriotic" groups or humanitarian organisations, while neo-Nazi groups tend to present themselves as "radical nationalists" by making covert or overt use of Nazi symbolism. Far-right groups stayed small in number; according to Džombić, about 30 far-right groups were active with about 5,000 members in 2011. As of 2018, far-right groups remain institutionally marginal, although their public influence is at a higher rate. According to Bojan Klačar, the executive director of CeSID, contemporary far-right groups do not pose a threat unless if the groups receive a large amount of support, while the political articulation of the groups are too weak to make an impact on the institutions. Clerical-fascist groups had been considered to be more politically influential and organised than neo-Nazi groups.

Far-right groups are centered on using the Internet, while many individuals have also published magazines and books. Stormfront, a neo-Nazi Internet forum, was established in the early 2000s in Serbia. Some groups are also centered on using social networks such as Facebook, Telegram and Signal, and alt-tech such as Parler. Far-right Facebook pages and groups in Serbia had received large amounts of following. Anti-immigrant activists had also formed a number of pages; this includes the Generation Identity, which also has branches in other countries. Followers of the far-right European Solidarity Front for Syria (ESFS) page had attended the first major anti-immigrant protest in Serbia in 2016. Regarding the media, they had stayed neutral regarding the migrant issue; they had reported incidents in which they participated, as well as the problems which they experienced. Publications such as Glas javnosti, Večernje novosti, Kurir, Alo!, and Pravda were associated with the far-right according to 2010 and 2011 reports. Far-right groups had also attacked publications that were viewed as more liberal. Local media in Serbia also tend to promote "Russian-friendly" news stories or anti-Western narratives; many websites were found to be spreading the idea of ethnic purification or neo-Nazism. It was also found out that website owners also tend to have connections with Russian state-controlled agencies such as RT and Sputnik.

Jim Dowson, a British far-right activist, and his Knights Templar International organisation had supplied bullet-proof vests and radios to Serbian groups in Kosovo. Dowson had regularly accompanied with Aleksandr Dugin and former British National Party leader Nick Griffin in Serbia. In late 2017, far-right groups threatened to murder Marinika Tepić, an opposition politician, after criticising Jim Dowson's visits to Serbia. Robert Rundo, the co-founder of the white supremacist Rise Above Movement (RAM), had appeared and recorded videos in Serbia through out of 2020. Russia had also solidified its presence in Serbian politics through connections with far-right parties; it had also asserted itself as a "protector of traditional values" and an alternative to the West. Sources claim that between 100 and 300 Serb "foreign fighters" joined the Russo-Ukrainian War on the side of Russia; Aleksandar Vučić, the president of Serbia, claimed that the foreign fighters were mercenaries, while others had stated that they were motivated by the sense of "nationalist solidarity". Some had received media attention, such as Dejan Berić. Some Serb foreign fighters had even joined pro-Russian paramilitary groups in Syria.

The Serbian far-right made a major impact on domestic terrorists such as Anders Behring Breivik and Brenton Tarrant. Far-right groups in Serbia had also followed the trend of the global far-right such as showing populist tendencies and representing themselves as the protectors of the "people" and "free speech". The growth of global far-right views, such as anti-immigrant views, had also spread in Serbia. Although the socio-economic situation of individuals, insufficient trust in institutions, and the inconsistent attitude of the state towards the far-right had also influenced the rise of anti-immigration.

History

Yugoslavia 
Following World War I, the Kingdom of Serbs, Croats and Slovenes was established. The state was composed of multiple ethnic groups, with the Serbs being the most populous group. It was initially a liberal Parliamentary Democracy, although in 1929, Alexander I imposed a dictatorship which lasted until 1934, and renamed the state to Yugoslavia. Alexander I's regime was described as "conservative authoritarian". During the interwar period, fascists and advocates of other far-right political movements in Yugoslavia received little support and some of them were even repressed by Alexander I's regime. The display of antisemitism in Yugoslavia was also rare.

The post-World War I Chetniks were ideologically divided; some of them believed that Yugoslavia should be governed in accordance with Serbian traditions and they also believed that the other two major ethnic groups, Croats and Slovenes, should be assimilated, while others had believed that a new Yugoslav national identity should be developed. Its members were also divided between the Democratic Party (DS), which favoured an all-Yugoslav identity, and the People's Radical Party (NRS) which favoured a Greater Serbian identity. Chetniks later developed into "parafascists" and adopted anti-liberal and anti-democratic views, while maintaining nationalist traditions. Members of the National Defence, a militaristic association, usually sided with Chetniks in conflicts. National Defence adopted fascism in the mid-1920s and became sceptical about the parliamentary system. It had also opposed internationalism and promoted the cultural unity of South Slavs. Velibor Jonić, a Serbian fascist politician, was a member of the National Defence. Following the assassination of Alexander I, Milan Stojadinović and his Yugoslav Radical Union (JRZ) came to power. JRZ acted as an all-Yugoslav party, and its members consisted of all three major ethnic groups. Stojadinović ruled as an authoritarian and imposed anti-democratic acts, while he had also saw fascism as an ideological role model, and adopted centralism during his premiership. Stojadinović was dismissed in 1939 and was replaced by Dragiša Cvetković. Dimitrije Ljotić, a Yugoslav Serb politician, who formed the Yugoslav National Movement (JNP Zbor), sought to introduce radical right and fascist policies. Zbor supported the creation of a corporative authoritarian regime, while it was also inspired by Italian fascism, anti-communism, and antisemitism. Ljotić cooperated with Bishop Nikolaj Velimirović, who was an antisemite and promoted anti-Western views; he had made an impact on Ljotić during the late interwar period. A chunk of its members had also left the party to join JRZ during Stojadinović's premiership. Zbor mainly received support from Serbs, and it remained a minor party after it received 1% of popular vote in 1935 and 1938 elections. After the beginning of World War II, the government of Yugoslavia adopted anti-Jewish laws. Milan Nedić was appointed prime minister of the puppet government in 1941; he was a supporter of fascist and ultranationalist policies. During his premiership, Nedić also promoted conspiracy theories about Jews. Kosta Pećanac, who headed Chetnik units from the 1930s, embraced chauvinism and led his group of Chetniks into allegiance with Nedić's government. Chetniks under Draža Mihailović began collaborating with the Axis Forces as early as in 1941. Mihailović denied that he collaborated with the Axis forces, although in 1943 he admitted it in a conversation with a British liaison officer. After 1943, Mihailović collaborated with the Nazi Germany on an informal basis. Chetniks during World War II were royalist and nationalist, while their main objective was the creation of a Greater Serb state within Yugoslavia. Chetniks also favoured population transfer.

After World War II, the Communist Party of Yugoslavia (KPJ), later known as League of Communists of Yugoslavia (SKJ), came to power and reformed the state as Federal People's Republic of Yugoslavia. Josip Broz Tito led Yugoslavia until his death in 1980, and shortly after his death, local branches of the SKJ began promoting ethno-nationalist rhetoric, including the League of Communists of Serbia (SKS). The leadership of SKS was replaced by a more conservative one that argued for more nationalist views. The early 1980s recession had an impact on Yugoslavia, the crisis was exploited by ethnic nationalists to capture power. Also, in the 1980s, a number of paramilitaries began forming in Kosovo. The SANU Memorandum, which was leaked in 1986, made an impact on the far-right politics in Serbia; the document combined xenophobic nationalist views with conservative socialism, and it argued for the establishment of Greater Serbia. Slobodan Milošević, who held conservative, communist, and anti-liberal views, supported the memorandum and used it to rise to power. Milošević staged a party coup against Ivan Stambolić, who opposed the memorandum, and later organised a campaign of street protests, named the anti-bureaucratic revolution. This served as a resurgence of the far-right.

1990s–2000s 

Following the revolutions of 1989, the far-right emerged again to the mainstream. Far-right groups brought extreme nationalism as well as the support for establishment of the Greater Serbia, while at the same time, they also gained broader acceptance due to Serbia's position in the Yugoslav Wars. After being sanctioned and following the increased inflation and high unemployment rate, xenophobia saw an increase during Serbia's period of isolationism. Nationalists, such as the Serbian Radical Party (SRS), exploited this to garner broader support amongst the public. They promoted historical revisionism, which had been already on the rise since the 1970s, and portrayed other Yugoslav ethnic groups as "betrayers" which formed the narrative of victimhood. SRS closely cooperated with Milošević's Socialist Party of Serbia (SPS) during the 1990s, although it also briefly served in opposition. The Serbian Renewal Movement (SPO), a major opposition party during the 1990s, had also promoted extremist nationalism, although it abandoned the ideology following the beginning of the Bosnian War. Milošević, although declaratively a leftist, had connections with the far-right and promoted extreme-nationalist and anti-Western sentiment; he also promoted antisemitic and racist conspiracy theories.

Many far-right organisations acted as paramilitary organisations and openly supported and committed violence during the Bosnian and Kosovo wars. The White Eagles, a paramilitary unit operated by SRS and its leader Vojislav Šešelj, committed war crimes in Croatia and Bosnia and Hezegovina. Its members were also referred as "chetniks". According to a United Nations report from 1994, 55 out of 82 paramilitaries in former Yugoslavia were led by Serbs. According to the Southern Poverty Law Center, far-right groups criticised the United States during the Kosovo War, including foreign individuals such as white nationalist Louis Beam, while neo-Nazis had done it because "they saw Muslims as a threat to Europe". After the NATO bombing of Yugoslavia in 1999 and up to the overthrow of Slobodan Milošević in October 2000, far-right conspiracy theories were spread, while critics of the government were assassinated. Journalist Slavko Ćuruvija was assassinated in 1999, while former president of Serbia, Ivan Stambolić, was assassinated in August 2000; an assassination attempt on Vuk Drašković, the leader of SPO, also occurred in October 1999.

Far-right groups in Serbia gained a considerable amount of public attention in the early 2000s, although after the election of Zoran Đinđić as prime minister it was seen that the development of far-right ideas would become less conducive. Far-right groups had also turned into registered movements and organisations. During June 2001, far-right groups had orchestrated violent attacks at the participators of the first pride parade in Serbia; the parade was cancelled half-way through. After Đinđić's assassination in 2003, far-right groups emerged again. According to Jovo Bakić, this rise occurred due to the promised social development and European Union accession which were not feasible, including the wave of privatisation that left vast numbers of people unemployed. These organisations were also often in opposition to each other, although they had common ideological motives. Since the 2000s, attacks orchestrated by far-right groups had risen. These attacks had often received media attention, although far-right groups did not attract much attention to the public. Due to the allegations that the government was involved in corrupt privatisation, SRS ran on an anti-corruption platform and placed first in the 2003 parliamentary election. SRS did not take part in forming a government. Věra Stojarová, a Masaryk University professor, pointed out that the high amount of votes for SRS showed the "high frustration of Serbs". In 2004, a law that defined the Chetniks as "anti-fascist" was welcomed by parties on the right. A year later, Chetniks were de facto equalised with the Yugoslav Partisans following the implementation of the law on soldiers' pensions. SRS placed first again in the 2007 parliamentary election. Aleksandar Gavrilović, an editor for Istinomer, stated that following the formation of the Serbian Progressive Party (SNS) in 2008, the far-right saw its support drop to bare minimums. The far-right received further expansion following the declaration of independence of Kosovo in 2008. Later in July 2008, far-right groups had organised protests in support of Radovan Karadžić, which turned out violent. In 2009, a Belgrade Pride event was cancelled due to the announcement that far-right groups would prevent the holding of the event. The Public Prosecutor's Office had stated that Obraz and SNP 1389 should be banned due to their threats that led to the cancellation of the Belgrade Pride event.

Contemporary period 

In October 2010, the Belgrade anti-gay riot occurred; it was marked with violence orchestrated by the far-right, which led to clashes with the police. Obraz was a notable participant in the riot. The Public Prosecutor's Office responded by submitting multiple proposals to the Constitutional Court in 2011. The Constitutional Court rejected the ban of 14 far-right groups in March, while in June, it deemed that actions of Nacionalni stroj were unconstitutional and the Court banned it; the 2011 pride event was cancelled due to threats from far-right groups. The Constitutional Court also rejected the proposal to ban SNP 1389 and SNP Naši. Obraz was banned a year later due to "violation of human and minority rights and causing national and religious hatred", although it continued to operate under a similar name. Since then, some far-right groups had pacificated their actions. Far-right groups had also organised protests in support of Ratko Mladić in May 2011. In the 2012 parliamentary election, for the first time since its establishment, SRS had not managed to cross the then-5 per cent electoral threshold and lost all of its seats in the National Assembly. According to Izabela Kisić, the executive director of Helsinki Committee for Human Rights in Serbia, the newly-elected government had since then practically tolerated the far-right. A year later, anti-Romani attacks in Zemun Polje were concluded by far-right groups. Draža Mihailović, the leader of Chetniks during World War II, was rehabilitated in 2015 by the Supreme Court of Cassation, claiming that he was politically and ideologically trialed; far-right groups had organised protests during the process of rehabilitation of Milan Nedić, although in the end, Nedić was not rehabilitated. Far-right groups had returned to the National Assembly following the 2016 parliamentary election.

A far-right group belonging to the white nationalist Identitarian movement had organised protests in 2017. Although a year later, the Identitarian branch in Serbia was dissolved due to unknown reasons; the branch was also linked with the promotion of discrimination. Kisić noted that Islamic extremism had saw a significant decline, while the far-right had been on the rise in the late 2010s. The Belgrade Centre for Security Policy (BCSP) noted that the far-right had begun showing anti-immigrant views, which did not exist before. This initially began during the 2015 migrant crisis, although political parties such as Dveri and Enough is Enough (DJB) began advocating anti-immigrant views in 2018. The two parties explicitly promoted the Eurabia conspiracy theory, and claimed that Serbian citizens would become a minority in their own country. Some organisations, such as Leviathan and People's Patrol orchestrated attacks against migrants. Its members had also begun "patrolling the streets" to intercept, threaten, warn, arrest, or expel migrants from public transport. Both groups also video-record their actions and share them across social media, while they also targeted citizens who had rented apartments to migrants. Opinion polls had also showed that the public shared similar anti-immigrant views with far-right organisations. According to a BCSP survey from 2020, the public viewed migrants as the greatest external threat to Serbia's security and as one of the three main threats to internal security, while three-quarters of respondents were concerned about free movement of migrants in towns and villages. In comparison with the research from 2017, in which the migrants were listed lower, the far-right made an impact on increasing anti-immigrant views among the public. In the same research, voters were also interested to know positions of political parties regarding migrants.

Following the beginning of the COVID-19 pandemic in Serbia in 2020, conspiracy theories regarding the virus had begun to spread; the far-right had also spread conspiracy theories. In the same year, the far-right had also seen a sudden rise in popularity. Following the 2020 parliamentary election, a series of protests took place in July. The government had portrayed the protests as led by the far-right; a small group of far-right activists did participate in the protests, including former MP Srđan Nogo. In October 2021, Facebook Inc. had published a series of documents that had included far-right groups in Serbia that were connected with terrorism, violence, and hate. A month later, a far-right group harassed and attacked several peace activist groups, including Women in Black, due to their opposition to denying the notion that Srebrenica massacre was a genocide. During the same period, a conflict emerged in Belgrade, after a far-right group had made a mural dedicated to Ratko Mladić; peace activists had threw eggs and paint at the mural to destroy it, although the groups would occasionally re-paint the mural. The conflict received national media attention, although the mural did not end up getting removed. Following the beginning of Russian invasion of Ukraine in February 2022, far-right groups had protested in support of Russia. The invasion had helped the far-right to cross the electoral threshold in the 2022 general election due to their pro-Russian views. Far-right groups had also stated their opposition to imposing sanctions on Russia. Dveri, Democratic Party of Serbia (DSS), and Serbian Party Oathkeepers (SSZ), all whom are pro-Russian, had entered the National Assembly. At the time of the campaign period, SSZ, SRS, and Serbian Right (SD) were viewed to be under the control of the government. During the 2022 EuroPride event in Belgrade, far-right groups clashed with the police.

Political groups 
According to the Anti-Discrimination Act, it is illegal for neo-Nazi or fascist groups to organise or to display fascist symbols. Organisations that were banned due to their far-right views had usually re-organised under a different name, while organisations that had received legal measures have either moved underground or transformed their ideological image. The government of Serbia had declared Obraz as a clerical-fascist organisation, while Nacionalni stroj, skinheads, Blood and Honour, and Rasonalisti were labelled as neo-Nazi.

Organisations

Blood and Honour 
Blood & Honour was formed in Serbia in 1995. It cooperates with its UK-based counterpart. Ideologically orientated towards neo-Nazism, Blood & Honour has been operating as an unregistered and secret organisation in Serbia. Combat 18 is its self-described "activist branch", while Blood & Honour also has chapters in Belgrade, Novi Sad, and Niš. The organisation has been regularly organising music concerts, it also takes part in neo-Nazi meetings abroad. Its members had meetings with the National Socialist Movement of Denmark. The organisation is opposed to abortions, capitalism, and communism. It also claimed that Jews are enemies of the "white race", and that they were responsible for the NATO bombing of Yugoslavia, a view that they also share with Obraz.

I live for Serbia 
I live for Serbia is a far-right organisation that has spread anti-vax and nationalist views. Its views had been also described as militaristic, while it is also opposed to LGBT rights. I live for Serbia wants to repeal the law that made vaccination mandatory and declared its support to make all non-governmental organisations illegal. Jovana Stojković, a former member of Dveri, has headed the organisation since its foundation. Stojković is a prominent anti-vaccination activist, she had claimed that vaccines cause autism, while she had also spread misinformation regarding COVID-19. During the COVID-19 pandemic in Serbia, Stojković and her organisation had opposed wearing protective masks. Due to her views, Stojković was detained several times, while the Court of the Regional Medical Chamber of Belgrade had initiated a procedure to revoke her medical doctor licence in 2018.

I live for Serbia previously cooperated with the neo-fascist Leviathan Movement. They organised protests together and participated in a joint list in the 2020 parliamentary election. During the electoral campaign in 2020, I live for Serbia had promoted antifeminist content. Their electoral list did not pass the 3-percent threshold. I live for Serbia was later a part of the Sovereignists coalition, together with Enough is Enough (DJB) and Healthy Serbia (ZS). It participated in the 2022 general election but failed to win any seats.

Leviathan 

Leviathan is a self-described animal rights group. Observers had described it as a "mix of National Front and PETA". Formed in 2015, it initially got its reputation from posting confessional videos on social media, in which individuals would apologise on camera for being cruel to animals. Individuals would continue by saying their personal information, while Leviathan would sometimes confiscate pets from certain individuals. It had later built a large following and garnered a large amount of fans. Members of Leviathan had previously been a part of neo-Nazi organisations. It has been described as a vigilantist group, a group of its members were sentenced in prison for four months, and additional 11 months under house arrest in 2020. Pavle Bihali, leader of Leviathan, had claimed that they do not use violence. A member of the group had drove into a migrant reception center in Obrenovac in May 2020; the driver was later sentenced to eight months in prison. While driving, the driver had chanted that "he does not want Serbia to become an Islamic country". Leviathan had later organised an operation against the largest animal shelter in Serbia in 2021, claiming that its owner had let its dogs die. Dejan Gačić, the owner of the animal shelter, had claimed that his animal shelter was attacked because Leviathan wanted to force him out due to the amount of foreign donations that he had received before the raid. Leviathan had also conducted personal attacks on the Internet.

Observers had described Leviathan as neo-fascist, neo-Nazi, and alt-right. Bihali identifies himself as a far-right nationalist and has expressed sympathy for Nazism; observers had also assessed him as a neo-Nazi. Bihali is a supporter of the Greek neo-fascist Golden Dawn organisation, and had considered the group as a model for Leviathan. An anti-migrant group, members of Leviathan had taken part in "street patrols" with the People's Patrol, while they had also portrayed migrants as "rapists". Bihali had had published misinformation regarding migrants. Its members had publicly expressed racist, anti-immigrant, and anti-ziganist views. Leviathan had promoted the Great Replacement conspiracy theory, while during the COVID-19 pandemic, Leviathan had spread misinformation about the virus.

Leviathan registered as an organisation in 2020, and participated in a joint list with I live for Serbia in the 2020 parliamentary election, although it failed to cross the threshold. Jovo Bakić had claimed that the organisation is in control of Aleksandar Vučić, while it has been also alleged that Leviathan had cooperated with SNS.

Nacionalni stroj 

Nacionalni stroj was a secret neo-Nazi organisation. It was affiliated with Blood & Honour and the neo-Nazi Internet forum Stormfront, and was considered to be a part of the "racist international". It was alleged that Nacionalni stroj and Blood & Honour concluded the destruction of Belgrade and Niš mosques in March 2004, attacks on the Women in Black movement in July 2005, and an assault on peace activists in Niš in May 2007. Nacionalni stroj also organised several far-right marches in 2007. These acts were celebrated by the organisations as "patriotic acts". During the anti-fascist walk in October 2007, members of the organisation had attacked participators and threw rocks at them. The gendarmery responded by detaining the attackers, while some of them were sentenced to be trialed at the Court. The Public Prosecutor's Office submitted a request in 2008 to ban Nacionalni stroj, which was concluded by the Constitutional Court in 2011. Its leader, Goran Davidović, nicknamed Führer, participated in the attack and was put on trial for the violent attacks. He did not appear in court, and instead moved to Trieste, where had lived until 2020, when he moved back to Serbia. The trial was suspended and charges were dropped in 2019. After moving back to Serbia, Davidović met with leaders of Obraz and Leviathan.

The organisation supported the establishment of a strong centralised nation-state that would be headed by an authoritarian head of state, who would enjoy the support of the military and Serbian Orthodox Church. Nacionalni stroj was antisemitic, and had stated that only white people would be entitled to full citizenship, while homosexuality, pornography, abortion, and other religious groups should be outlawed.

National Serb Front 
Formed in 2011, National Serb Front came to the far-right scene after the ban of Nacionalni stroj 2011. Stefan Dolić, a former member of Nacionalni stroj, has headed the organisation since its inception. National Serb Front had organised meetings with several neo-Nazi parties, including the National Democratic Party of Germany and People's Party Our Slovakia. Its logo had drawn comparisons with the New Force of Italy and Noua Dreaptă of Romania. Members of the National Serb Front had regularly participated in far-right protests and street fights. The organisation had published content dedicated to the leader of Nacionalni stroj. In 2017, the liberal New Party had called for the ban of National Serb Front. National Serb Front is ideologically opposed to neoliberalism and advocates for a "Europe of Nations".

Obraz 

Obraz was founded in the mid-1990s by a group of students that had published a magazine under an eponymous name. Nebojša M. Krstić led the organisation until his death in 2001, after which Mladen Obradović succeeded him in 2003. Under Obradović's leadership, Obraz formed connections with far-right groups from Romania, Slovakia, France, Italy, and Spain. Since its inception, Obraz organised violent attacks. It played a central role in the Belgrade anti-gay riot that took place in 2010; its leader and other members were arrested a day before to stop the riot. After the parade, additional 250 individuals were arrested. The government of Serbia had previously submitted an initiative in regards to its operations, while in 2012, the Constitutional Court banned Obraz. Obradović later re-registered the organisation under the name "Svetosavski savez Obraz". Throughout its existence, Obraz had only participated in the 2014 parliamentary election, when it was a part of a joint list together with the Serbian Radical Party (SRS) and SNP Naši. Obradović was a controller during the 2022 constitutional referendum.

The government of Serbia listed Obraz as a clerical-fascist organisation in 2005; observers also described Obraz as clerical-fascist. Obraz has been defined as hardline nationalist, it is also openly antisemitic and it opposes minority rights. The organisation had also declared that Jews, Croats, Albanians, and other minority groups in Serbia are their enemies. Throughout the 2000s, Obraz had concluded a series of attacks against minority groups and homosexuals; major attacks on homosexuals occurred in 2001 and 2010. They had also called for punishment of homosexuals and non-Orthodox religious believers. Obraz called for rehabilitation of Dimitrije Ljotić, while it had also celebrated convicted war criminals Radovan Karadžić and Ratko Mladić as war heroes. Obraz supports the dismantling of liberal democracy, which it called a "judeo-masonic tool of oppression", it argued that a corporative state must be established instead, and it promoted theocracy. The organisation is opposed to Serbia joining the European Union, and called instead for the establishment of Greater Serbia.

People's Patrol 

The People's Patrol is a far-right anti-immigrant organisation which began their actions in 2020. It is centered in Belgrade, although it also has branches in border towns such as Sombor, Bačka Palanka, and Šid. Its members occasionally stop migrants from entering into Serbia in border towns. They had also disturbed journalists at their protests. Their members had been involved in several incidents; in fall of 2020, one of them threatened and blocked paths of taxi drivers who were transporting migrants, while in 2021, a People's Patrol member kicked out a group of migrants out of a bus, and threatened them with violence. Later in October 2021, People's Patrol concluded attacks against a Sombor native after letting migrants sleep in his hostel. The person who operated the hostel received death threats from People's Patrol members and supporters. Multiple anti-immigrant protests were also organised by the People's Patrol, starting in March 2020. The participants had also showed nationalist and anti-vaccination sentiment.

People's Patrol has been also described as ultranationalist. Alongside Leviathan, the organisation had portrayed migrants as "rapists" and called for people that helped migrants to be lynched. The People's Patrol had used the lack of trust in institutions as a reason and justification to patrol and arrest migrants, and it had also publicly criticised the police. Its leader, Damnjan Knežević, was summoned several times by the police for inciting hatred and intolerance. Knežević was a member of the SSZ, and had served as its vice-president at one point. Besides their anti-immigrant activity, its members had also launched an initiative regarding Kosovo, which was viewed as ethno-nationalist. The organisation had also promoted antifeminism and misogyny. Following the 2022 Russian invasion of Ukraine, People's Patrol had staged several pro-Russian protests in March and April 2022. People's Patrol has connections with far-right groups in Russia that took part in the 2022 invasion of Ukraine. In January 2023, lawyer Čedomir Stojković accused Knežević of being a member of the Wagner Group and recruiting Serbian citizens to fight in Ukraine.

According to a research, supporters of the People's Patrol tend to be younger and middle-aged men with a secondary education and manual jobs. Srđan Nogo, Jovana Stojković and Goran Davidović had stated their support for the organisation.

SNP 1389 

SNP 1389 was formed in 2004. The organisation was initially called "1389", but it later changed its name to "1389 Movement" and then into SNP 1389. Radojko Ljubičić served as the first leader, although he was dismissed by Miša Vacić in 2008, after which Vacić proclaimed himself as the leader of the organisation. During his leadership, Vacić had participated in far-right protests across Europe and orchestrated anti-LGBT protests in Serbia. Due to his discriminatory actions against the LGBT population, Vacić was detained several times. The main belligerents of the movement are far-right hooligan groups that have been linked with organised crime. In 2008, a group of its members had attacked the participants of the Queer festival; Vacić and others were arrested due to the attack. SNP 1389 had also organised protests in support of Ratko Mladić. For a brief period between 2010 and 2011, SNP 1389 was merged with SNP Naši. SNP 1389 participated in the 2014 Belgrade City Assembly election, in which it won 0.08% of the popular vote.

The organisation has been classified as far-right, staunchly nationalist and ultraconservative. SNP 1389 has been also described as neo-Nazi. It denies the notion that Srebrenica massacre was a genocide and promotes irredentism; they have also claimed North Macedonia and parts of Northern Albania as part of Greater Serbia. They had listed drug addicts, homosexuals, and the Catholic Church as its enemies. SNP 1389 also advocates for nationalisation of foreign-acquired Serbian companies.

SNP Naši 
The organisation was founded in 2006 by former members of Obraz. A far-right organisation led by Ivan M. Ivanović, it has used similar rhetoric to SNP 1389. Ivanović appeared on court multiple times, proceedings against him were held due to provoking racial discrimination. Charges against him were dropped in 2018. SNP Naši had later changed its name to Conservative Movement Naši. Observers had described it as a clerical-fascist organisation, it supports the creation of Greater Serbia and has opposed LGBT rights. As a staunch pro-Russian organisation, SNP Naši had called for Eurasian integration; it had also organised antisemitic acts. SNP Naši is staunchly critical of Josip Broz Tito. The organisation had also called to ban George Soros-funded NGOs in Serbia.

Serbian Action 

Serbian Action was formed in 2010. The organisation had tried to stop the "Propaganda Poster in Nedić's Serbia" forum from being held in 2015, although it had failed. Serbian Action had also attended multiple far-right protests; in 2018, it had organised a meeting in support of rehabilitation of Milan Nedić. The organisation has been described as clerical-fascist, and also as neo-fascist with clerical elements. It is staunchly socially conservative, and it opposes LGBT rights; it had accused the LGBT community of spreading "gay propaganda". Serbian Action had previously published several anti-ziganist articles. One of its members was arrested in 2014 after calling to lynch Romanis. It had also stated its support for monarchism and opposition to capitalism.

Serbian Honour 

A self-described humanitarian organisation, Serbian Honour was formed in 2014. It has been led by Bojan Stojković since its formation. The organisation also has a branch in Republika Srpska; the branch was previously headed by Igor Bilbija, who was arrested for prostitution and racketeering. Serbian Honour garnered public attention in 2014 after participating in attacks during a football game between Albania and Serbia. Three years later, Stojković had organised a protest to stop the projection of a documentary movie that had showed positive relations between Serbs and Albanians during the Yugoslav Wars. In 2019, members of the Serbian Honour organisation stole a horse from a Romani boy. They subsequently video-taped his "re-education" and posted it across social media. Serbian Honour had returned the horse to its owners later that year.

According to the Business Register Agency (APR), the organisation has been listed as a youth organisation that promotes youth activism, human rights, and conservationism. In practice, it has been described as an extremist paramilitary organisation, while the organisation had also promoted militarism and praised convicted war criminals. Its members had also promoted homophobia and opposed minority rights. Serbian Honour has been also described as a Russian-trained paramilitary organisation.

Political parties

Dveri 

Initially a political organisation, Dveri was formed in 1999 by a group of students that had published a magazine named Dveri Srpske. Boško Obradović, one of the co-founders of the organisation, has led Dveri since 2015. Dveri had already taken the characteristics of a political party in the late 2000s, although it registered as a political party in 2015. The party began participating in electoral politics in 2012, and has continued to participate in them since then, although it boycotted the 2020 parliamentary election. The party entered the National Assembly in 2016 after winning 7 seats in the parliamentary election. It was later a part of the catch-all opposition Alliance for Serbia. Dveri returned to the National Assembly following the 2022 election. It had also proved to have a relatively stable electorate at the national level. Dveri had previously cooperated with United Russia and Alternative for Germany.

Throughout the 2000s, Dveri promoted a combination of clericalism and extreme nationalism named svetosavlje, an ideology linked to Bishop Nikolaj Velimirović. Dveri promotes closer ties of state and church, and has been accused of homophobia due to their Christian right stances. Máté-Tóth described Dveri as "religious fundamentalist". Dveri has regularly organised "family walks" in 2009, as a counter-parade that promotes conservative values. It also has close ties with the Serbian Orthodox Church. Dveri had also campaigned against abortion and gay rights. A populist party, Dveri had shifted their views from Jews to homosexuals, and later campaigned for the "traditional family". It had also campaigned on anti-immigration. Regarding economics, Dveri is supportive of economic nationalism and protectionism. A party that advocates for monarchism, it supports a hierarchical society that would be governed by a king and pseudo-democratic institutions, which would eventually replace liberal democracy. Dveri is opposed to Serbia joining the European Union, and has showed its opposition to the West and its support for Russia. Vladan Glišić, a former high-ranking member, had accused the European Union of being "fascist". It opposes sanctioning Russia in regards to the 2022 Russian invasion of Ukraine.

Scholars had described Dveri as far-right and right-wing extremist, while Rada Drezgić described it as a conservative movement. Bakić rejected to describe Dveri as fascist and instead he had described it as extremely conservative, nationalist and anti-globalist. It has been also ideologically identified as ultranationalist. Dinić had commented on their political program, describing it as a fusion of ultranationalism with elements of fascism. Political scientists Florian Bieber and Filip Milačić have also described Dveri as far-right. Obradović had self-described Dveri as an anti-fascist party.

Serbian Party Oathkeepers 

Formed in 2012, Serbian Party Oathkeepers (SSZ) has been described as a far-right political party. Milica Đurđević Stamenkovski has been the main spokesperson of the party since its formation. SSZ had attacked non-governmental organisations (NGOs) and labelled them as "foreign mercenaries". SSZ has also been aided by the ruling Serbian Progressive Party (SNS). It had cooperated with the Italian Lega Nord party and had meetings with United Russia. In 2016, its representatives had met with Sergey Lavrov during his visit to Belgrade.

An ultranationalist party, SSZ promotes socially conservative views and opposes immigration. SSZ has been a vocal supporter of historical revisionism; it had claimed that "Serbians have been victims of the West", and had supported revision of history textbooks. It opposes Serbia joining the European Union and wants to establish closer ties with Russia. It had regularly participated in parliamentary elections, although it only managed to cross the threshold after the 2022 election.

Serbian Radical Party 

Often described as the most important far-right party in Serbia, Serbian Radical Party (SRS) was founded in 1991, and has been led by Vojislav Šešelj since then. SRS supported Milošević and his SPS in the first half of the 1990s, since Milošević had contributed to the mass support that SRS received due to media control. It also briefly served in opposition, but it again cooperated with SPS during the "war government". Members of SRS were involved in paramilitary activities during the Yugoslav Wars. Šešelj was convicted of war crimes by the International Criminal Tribunal for the former Yugoslavia (ICTY) in 2003, and later that year, after campaigning on an anti-corruption platform, it placed first in the 2003 parliamentary election, but it did not join the government. Tomislav Nikolić and Aleksandar Vučić gradually moderate the image of the party, although in 2008 they had split from SRS to form the SNS. In comparison with SRS, SNS has been supportive of accession of Serbia to the European Union. SRS dropped out of the parliament in 2012, although it returned in 2016 after Šešelj was permitted to come back to Serbia. In the 2020 election and afterwards, it did not receive enough votes to cross the electoral threshold.

An ultranationalist party, it was described as also described as neo-fascist during the 1990s and early 2000s. Observers had also described it as quasi-fascist. SRS is a major proponent of Greater Serbia, an irredentist concept that would include parts of Bosnia and Herzegovina, Croatia, Montenegro, and Kosovo. A populist party, it opposes Serbia joining the European Union and promotes closer ties with Russia. It is socially conservative and is in favour of welfare chauvinism. SRS was previously supported by far-right skinheads, although they terminated their support following Šešelj's refusal to support them after the murder of a Romani child in 1999.

Serbian Radical Party has local branches in Bosnia and Herzegovina, Montenegro, and North Macedonia. It was also the guest of Vladimir Zhirinovsky, leader of the Liberal Democratic Party of Russia.

Serbian Right 

Serbian Right (SD) is a far-right political party led by Miša Vacić. Vacić previously headed SNP 1389. The party was formed out of fifteen movements that had similar ideological beliefs, while it also received support from Jim Dowson, a British far-right activist, and local political leaders. Observers had claimed that the party is in control of Aleksandar Vučić. During one of its early assembly conferences in Šabac, Vacić threatened opposition politicians Marinika Tepić and Nebojša Zelenović with violence. Government associates such as Milenko Jovanov and Zoran Đorđević participated in the conference. Vacić had also organised attacks against opposition figures in 2017 and 2019. Later in June 2021, Vacić attended a meeting that was organised by the neo-fascist Alliance for Peace and Freedom. Vacić was a presidential candidate in the 2022 election; he won 0.9 per cent of the popular vote.

An ultranationalist party, it has promoted traditionalism, and had stated its support for Serbia joining the Euroasian Union. Vacić had stated his support for the Russian invasion of Ukraine. According to its program, the party supports the formation of a patriarchal and hierarchal society, monarchy, authority, and Serbian Orthodoxy. Its rhetoric has been considered to be racist and anti-migrant.

Others 

Far-right organisations such as Sveti Justin Filozof and Nomokanon, had also received media attention. Sveti Justin Filozof was a nationalist organisation, which was led by Milan Bates. It had later moderated their stances, although it was dissolved by 2008. Nomokanon was aided by the Serbian Orthodox Church (SPC). Rasonalisti, a neo-Nazi organisation, was active throughout the 2000s. They had rejected the left–right political spectrum, and instead supported "racial nationalism". Rasonalisti also operated an Internet forum, which acted similar to Stormfront. Solidarité Kosovo, a far-right organisation, is led by Arnaud Gouillon and it promotes historical revisionism. Gouillion took part in the 2012 French presidential election, in which he was a candidate for the white supremacist Generation Identity movement. In 2020, he was appointed to the position of director of the Office for Cooperation with the Diaspora and the Serbs in the Region.

Party of Serbian Unity was a far-right political party led by Željko Ražnatović "Arkan". An ultranationalist party, it was represented in the National Assembly during the 2000–2003 convocation. The far-right Sixty-Four Counties Youth Movement, which was led by László Toroczkai, was formed in Serbia in 2004. It advocated for separatism and the re-creation of Greater Hungary. Toroczkai was banned from entering Serbia by the government in 2008. Before forming the Sixty-Four Counties Youth Movement, Toroczkai was associated with the far-right Hungarian Justice and Life Party (MIÉP), and later served as vice-president of neo-Nazi Jobbik. Toroczkai was expelled from Jobbik, who had shifted ideologically to the centre-right, and then formed the Our Homeland Movement in 2018.

Individuals 
Vojislav Šešelj, the president of the Serbian Radical Party (SRS), has been noted to be the most famous far-right individual in Serbia. Alongside him, Tomislav Nikolić and Aleksandar Vučić, who were high-ranking members of SRS, were also noted as notable far-right individuals. Nikolić and Vučić abandoned the far-right after forming the populist Serbian Progressive Party (SNS) in 2008. SNS came to power in 2012, after which Serbia has suffered from democratic backsliding into authoritarianism. Šešеlj had supported Vučić in the 2022 election.

Individuals such as Boško Obradović, Miša Vacić, and Mladen Obradović had been also described as notable far-right individuals. Vacić has been a prominent far-right individual since the 2000s, mainly due to regularly attending and organising far-right protests, and due to his arrests. Vacić was arrested several times for spreading hatred. Alongside him, Mladen Obradović, leader of Obraz, had received public attraction due to his views. Srđan Nogo, who previously served as member of the National Assembly from 2016 to 2020, had promoted multiple far-right conspiracy theories.

Žejko Ražnatović "Arkan" was a prominent mobster who was associated with far-right criminal and paramilitary groups. He led a group of Belgrade criminals and was the leader of the far-right Party of Serbian Unity.

See also 
 Neo-fascism
 Neo-Nazism
 Radical right (Europe)
 Serbian nationalism

References

Bibliography

News sources

Footnotes

External links 

 Why won't Serbia condemn Putin's war? | Focus on Europe, on YouTube
 Riots Erupt at Serbia Gay Pride Parade, on YouTube
 Far-right disrupt Serbia gay pride parade, on YouTube

Further reading 
 Vučić, Marija (21 September 2021). "Hate, Lies and Vigilantes: Serbian 'Anti-Vaxxer' Brigade Plays With Fire" (in Serbian). Balkan Insight.

Far-right politics in Serbia
Political history of Serbia
Political movements in Serbia
Far-right politics in Europe
Neo-Nazism in Serbia
Serbian nationalism
Serbian irredentism
Anti-immigration politics in Europe
Antisemitism in Serbia
Fascist movements
Anti-Islam sentiment in Europe